Kim Han-byul (born 21 November 1986) is a South Korean basketball player for Yongin Samsung Blueminx and the South Korean national team.

She participated at the 2018 FIBA Women's Basketball World Cup.

References

External links

1986 births
Living people
Guards (basketball)
Indiana Hoosiers women's basketball players
People from Sacheon
South Korean expatriate basketball people in the United States
South Korean women's basketball players
Basketball players at the 2018 Asian Games
Asian Games silver medalists for Korea
Asian Games medalists in basketball
Medalists at the 2018 Asian Games
Sportspeople from South Gyeongsang Province